Nemaha is the name of several places in the United States, including:

 Nemaha, Iowa
 Nemaha, Nebraska
 Nemaha County, Kansas 
 Nemaha County, Nebraska
 Nemaha Township, Gage County, Nebraska